Sewanee may refer to:
 Sewanee, Tennessee
 Sewanee: The University of the South
 The Sewanee Review, an American literary magazine established in 1892
 Sewanee Natural Bridge
 Saint Andrews-Sewanee School

See also

 Suwanee (disambiguation)
 Suwannee (disambiguation)
 Swanee (disambiguation)